Ahenobarbus (Latin, 'red-beard', literally 'bronze-beard'), also spelled Aenobarbus or Ænobarbus, may refer to:

 Gnaeus Domitius Ahenobarbus (disambiguation), Romans
 Lucius Domitius Ahenobarbus (disambiguation), Romans
 Lucius Domitius Ahenobarbus, birth name of Nero, Roman emperor 54–68
 Frederick Barbarossa, known in Latin as Fridericus Ænobarbus, Holy Roman Emperor 1155–1190

See also